The Aerosvit chess tournament is an annual chess tournament played in Foros, Ukraine, and sponsored by the now defunct Aerosvit Airlines. It started in 2006 and the format is a closed single round-robin tournament of twelve players.

Winners
{| class="wikitable" style="text-align:center;"
! # !! Year !! Winner(s) !! Points  !! Category
|-
| 1 || 2006 || align=left |  || 7.5  || XVIII (2691)
|-
| 2 || 2007 || align=left |  || 7.5  || XVIII (2694)
|-
| 3 || 2008 || align=left |  || 8  || XIX (2712)
|}

References
 Reports from Chessbase: 2006, 2007, 2008
 Results from TWIC: 2006, 2007, 2008

External links
Official website

Chess competitions
Chess in Ukraine
Sports competitions in Crimea
International sports competitions hosted by Ukraine
2006 in chess
2007 in chess
2008 in chess
2006 in Ukrainian sport
2007 in Ukrainian sport
2008 in Ukrainian sport
Recurring sporting events established in 2006
Recurring sporting events disestablished in 2008
2006 establishments in Ukraine
2008 disestablishments in Ukraine